The women's shot put at the 2018 IAAF World U20 Championships was held at Ratina Stadium on 11 July.

Records

Results

Qualification
The qualification round took place in two groups, with Group A starting at 10:15 and Group B starting at 11:30. Athletes attaining a mark of at least 15.50 metres( Q ) or at least the 12 best performers ( q ) qualified for the final.

Final
The final took place at 16:35.

References

shot put
Shot put at the World Athletics U20 Championships